Palaeopotorous priscus is a fossil species of a diprotodont marsupial, known from specimens obtained in central Australia. The animal was similar to the modern species of the family Potoroidae, the potoroos and bettongs.

Taxonomy 
The only known species of its genus, Palaeopotorous, which has been allied to the subfamily Potoroinae or as the type of a subfamily, Palaeopotoroinae, in the potoroid family.

Description 
The dental evidence of the species indicates it was a similar size to a small to medium 'rat-kangaroos' that were common into the twentieth century.

Since its first discovery, the species has been suspected of representing an early lineage of the macropods. The finds have been placed to the late Oligocene period, for which the fossil record of early macropods is otherwise absent. Palaeopotorous priscus has been proposed to be the earliest known lineage of macropod, sharing the rudiments of features found in the smaller rat-kangaroos and larger kangaroos and wallabies.

References

Prehistoric marsupial genera
Potoroids